Olivier Bellin (born 8 August 1971) is a French chef, two stars at the Guide Michelin. He is the owner of the restaurant L'Auberge des Glazicks in Plomodiern, a village located between Quimper and Brest in the department of Finistère.

Professional career 
A former student at the professional high school "Le Paraclet" in Quimper, Olivier Bellin began his career working from 1995 to 1996 with Joël Robuchon in Paris as a cooking assistant and roasting chef. He then returned to Brittany in La Roche-Bernard working with chef Jacques Thorel in his restaurant with two Michelin stars.

He transformed the inn of his parents, a simple restaurant, into a gastronomic restaurant. During all that time and with the support of Alain Ducasse who invited him to participate at the concept Food France, he started to become well known and began developing his cuisine.

In 2005, he received his first Michelin star. The 2009 edition of the Gault Millau gave him 4 toques and the grade of 17/20 for his restaurant L'Auberge des Glazicks. In 2010, he received his second Michelin star.

Olivier Bellin opened The Ocean at The Pulse in Repulse Bay, Hong Kong in 2017. The restaurant earned its first Michelin star in just its first year of operation.

Bibliography 
 Saveur blé noir en Finistère, Collection "Carnet de chef", Romain Pages Éditions, Sommières.
 Écailles et coquilles, Poissons & crustacés, Romain Pages Éditions, Sommières.
 Bretagne, Romain Pages Éditions.

Honours 
Chevalier des Arts et des Lettres (2011)

See also 
List of Michelin starred restaurants

References

External links 
 Official site of the Auberge des Glazicks
 Official site of The Ocean

1971 births
French chefs
French people of Breton descent
People from Quimper
Living people
Head chefs of Michelin starred restaurants
Chevaliers of the Ordre des Arts et des Lettres